Colm McLoughlin (born July 1943) is an Irish businessman, and the executive vice chairman and CEO of Dubai Duty Free, an airport retailer with a turnover of US$2.029 billion in 2019 (AED Dh7.406 billion). Owned by the Government of Dubai, and part of the Investment Corporation of Dubai (ICD), Dubai Duty Free manages all aspects of the retail operation at Dubai International Airport and Al Maktoum International Airport.

Early life 
Colm McLoughlin was born in July 1943, in Ballinasloe, Co. Galway, one of five children of Tadhg Mac Lochlainn and Mel Kelly. He is a brother of Ray McLoughlin, former Ireland international rugby player.

Educated at Garbally College in Ballinasloe, McLoughlin was a sportsman who played hurling and tennis and went on to play rugby for his province. He also holds a private pilot license (small aircraft).

Career 
McLoughlin's intended career in dentistry took a back seat when he went to London in the early 1960s and began working in retail. He joined the high-street chain of Woolworths, where he worked his way up to become one of the youngest managers in the company. During a summer holiday back in Ireland in 1969 he responded to an advert for a manager at Shannon Airport Duty Free. He got the job and went on to become general manager of the duty-free operation.  In 1983, at the request of the Government of Dubai, he was one of a team of ten from Aer Rianta (the Irish Airport Authority) contracted by the Dubai Government to set up Dubai Duty Free at Dubai International Airport. Following the opening in December 1983, he was asked to remain as general manager of the fledgling operation which in its first year of business achieved sales of US$20 million. He went on to become managing director in 1995.

Dubai Duty Free has seen massive growth and development over the years and was named the single largest airport retailer in the world in terms of turnover. The retail operation covers over 38,000 square metres of retail space at Dubai International Airport. Meanwhile, the Dubai Duty Free operation at Dubai World Central - Al Maktoum International Airport continues to do well and covers 2,500 square metres. In the long term, the airport has capacity for over 160 million passengers and ultimately, the retail operation will cover some 80,000 square metres. Dubai Duty Free currently employs 6,200 staff, including 25 of its original 100 staff recruited in 1983. Under his lead, Dubai Duty Free has won more than 650 awards around the world. By the year 2020, it expects business to be in excess of US$3 billion a year, employing between 9,000 and 10,000 people.

In July 2011, McLoughlin was named executive vice-chairman of Dubai Duty Free which also incorporates a leisure division comprising the Aviation Club, The Irish Village, both in Garhoud and Riverland Dubai, The Century Village, the Dubai Duty Free Tennis Stadium and the Jumeirah Creekside Hotel which opened in July 2012. Another title was added on his designation as chief executive officer (CEO) in June 2016.

McLoughlin is chairman of the Dubai Duty Free Foundation, a non-profit charity founded in 2004 which is under the auspices of Sheikh Ahmed bin Saeed Al Maktoum, president of Dubai Civil Aviation Authority and chairman of Dubai Duty Free.

McLoughlin has received many awards. These include the Frontier Lifetime Achievement award which was presented in 2004 by Frontier magazine, making him only the second person after Brendan O'Regan, the founder of the airport duty free industry, to receive this accolade. In 2000, McLoughlin was the first non-UAE national at the time to receive the Most Distinguished Employee Award from the Dubai Government Excellence Awards while back in his home country, he was named as "Galway Millennium Man of the Year".

In October 2014, McLoughlin was presented with the Irish Presidential Distinguished Service Award for Business and Education category.

In 2017, McLoughlin received an honorary doctorate of the University from Middlesex University Dubai.

In 2018, Dubai Duty Free has received 33 awards from various entities including the Frontier Awards for 'Airport Retailer of the Year', which was won by the operation for a remarkable ninth time, as well as awards presented to McLoughlin such as the "Charity Champion of the Year” at the annual Duty Free News International Global Travel Awards for Travel Retail Excellence held in London. Colm was also named as one of the 50 Most Influential Expats in the UAE, in a list released by Forbes Middle East Magazine and was honoured with the “Lifetime Achievement Award” at The BURJ CEO Awards organised by CEO Clubs Network held in China and the MENAA “Best Business Leaders Award” for the third time held in Dubai in December.

In 2019, Colm was awarded with “Outstanding Contribution to the Aviation Industry” at the annual Aviation Industry Awards held in Dublin. Colm was also honoured by Kildare County Council for his outstanding contribution to County Kildare through Dubai Duty Free's sponsorship of the Dubai Duty Free Irish Derby for the past twelve years and the Dubai Duty Free Irish Open held in the K Club in 2016, the Lifetime Achievement Award at the Middle East Hospitality Awards in September and the Asian Business Leadership Forum (ABLF) Awards and the Middle East Economic Digest (MEED) Awards for Male Leader of the Year in November.

Significantly, on 1 June 2019, McLoughlin celebrated 50 years in the duty free industry.

Personal life 
McLoughlin has three children and lives in Dubai with his wife Breeda. His eldest son also lives in Dubai while his two daughters and two grandchildren live in the UK. He is an active member of the Dubai business and social community and is the former chairman of the Dubai Irish Society, former president of the Dubai Celts and former captain of the Dubai Irish Golf Society. He was the captain of the Emirates Golf Club (1995/1996) and the Dubai Creek and Golf Club (2007).

References 

Irish businesspeople
People from Ballinasloe
1943 births
Irish chief executives
Irish expatriates in the United Arab Emirates
Living people